The Ericsson Method is an assisted reproductive technology for sex selection, used before implantation. In this method, sperm that will give rise to male versus female children are separated by moving at different speeds through a protein solution.

When used to increase the likelihood of a female child, studies have resulted in between 70% and 80% female children.

When used to increase the likelihood of a male child, studies have resulted in between 50% to 75% male children.

Method
The Ericsson method is based on the belief that X-sperm swim slower than Y-sperm.  Sperm are placed atop a "column" of increasingly thicker layers of albumin, and allowed to swim down into the solution. After a certain time period has elapsed, the sperm can be separated into the faster and slower swimmers.  If the couple desires a male baby the faster swimmers are artificially inseminated, and if the couple desires a female baby the same procedure is enacted with the slower swimmers.

This method differs from the Shettles method, which does not utilize artificial insemination.

History
It was developed and patented by Dr. Ronald Ericsson.  The method has been in use since the mid-1970s.

References

Further reading

The below references were taken from 123 published papers.  These references represent the initial scientific research, the concepts behind altering the sex ratio, the clinical results and the social and demographic history of people who elect to use this technology for a wanted sex selected child. 
  
 
  
 
   
 
   
 
   
 
   
 
   
 
   
 
   
 
   
 
   
 Ericsson RJ and Ericsson SA. 1999 Sex Ratios. In: Knobil E, Neill JD (Eds.). Encyclopedia of Reproduction. Academic Press, CA. Volume 4, pages 431–437. 
   
 

Human reproduction